The Battle of Alvøen was a naval battle of the Gunboat War between Denmark-Norway and the United Kingdom of Great Britain and Ireland. It was fought on 16 May 1808 in Vatlestraumen, outside Bergen in Norway, between the British frigate HMS Tartar and a Norwegian force consisting of four kanonjolles and one kanonsjalupp (collectively known as gunboats).

The Royal Navy was then blockading the coast of Norway, causing major difficulties since the country was then dependent on Danish imports of grain and other foodstuffs. Having lost their fleet in the Battle of Copenhagen in 1807, Denmark-Norway was unable to afford the time or money to rebuild their high-seas fleet of corvettes, frigates and ships of the line and so had been forced to construct small vessels or gunboats for coastal defence.

The British frigate was underway to Bergen harbour in search of a Dutch privateer named Gelderland, known by the British to be seeking shelter in the harbour during repairs. On the evening on 15 May, a message was received at Bergenhus Fortress stating that a British frigate had been sighted, and was probably heading towards Bergen. After the frigate had been sighted at Alvøen, near Bergen, on 16 May, the five vessels making up the entire Norwegian sea force in the Bergen region were ordered to row out and engage the enemy. The frigate lay becalmed outside Alvøen, and in thick fog. The Norwegian vessels took up a position between Alvøen and the frigate, and opened fire. The battle lasted about one hour, during which the British lost 2 men, including Post Captain Bettesworth, commander of the frigate. Norwegian losses were four men killed and unknown amount wounded.

Background
After 1807, when the entire Danish-Norwegian fleet was captured and sailed to Britain after the British victory at Copenhagen, Denmark-Norway moved from 'armed neutrality' to open warfare against Britain. The Royal Navy blockaded the Skagerrak and cruised along the Norwegian coast, capturing merchant vessels as prizes and engaging coastal merchant convoys. The Norwegian population depended on the import of grain from other countries, particularly Denmark, but supplies dried up as enemy warships captured the merchant vessels carrying them. With the loss of the high seas fleet, and the blockade of the Norwegian coast, the two countries were left to design and build a coastal defence system. As funds were lacking  to construct even smaller vessels in sufficient numbers, people were urged to give money and valuables to raise funds for the construction of gunboats

Another important factor involved were Norwegian privateers, civil ships granted letters of marque by the Danish government legally allowing them to engage and seize enemy vessels along the country's coast and retaining 99% of these vessels' value so long as 1% of it was then given to the government. Norwegian privateers operated as far as Scotland, and British merchants began to demand better protection from the Royal Navy. As a result, the Royal Navy sent even more warships to the Norwegian coast, trying to prevent the privateers from ever reaching the open sea and any trading ships from entering Norwegian waters.

Context
In May 1808, a Dutch frigate named Gelderland entered Bergen harbour seeking a sheltered spot to conduct repairs. Several privateers were also present in the harbour. The Royal Navy received intelligence about the Dutch frigate, and sent the frigates Tartar, Adriane and the corvette Cygnet from Leith in Scotland on 10 May, with orders to intercept the frigate and report on its movements. On 7 May, Gelderland had left Bergen; at least that is what local fishermen told Post Captain George Edmund Byron Bettesworth when Tartar entered the area of Stolmen west of Bergen on 15 May.

Some sources claim that Tartar was flying Dutch colours upon entering Norwegian waters on 15 May, and was therefore unsuspected, since the Netherlands were then an ally of Denmark-Norway against Britain. Norwegian fishermen and pilots sailed out in small boats to welcome the vessel and to offer their assistance as pilots - the Dutch flag might have fooled them into thinking the Tartar was the Gelderland returning. The pilots would have rushed to the vessel since the first there would get the job of piloting that vessel but, upon arrival, the pilots and fishermen were taken prisoner and forced to guide the vessel in through the narrow fjords leading to Bergen. They were tried by the Norwegian authorities after the battle and a transcript of their interrogation tells of what happened next:

Tartar sailed into what is now Marstein fyr (holmen Marsteinen). To the south, at Sotra, near Kleppe (Kleppholmen), was an optical telegraph station, part of the telegraph system along the coast. This station observed the frigate, still flying a Dutch flag and not thought to be a threat, and the station's head (carrying the signal book) and his assistant rowed out to the frigate, but were both taken prisoner, thus breaking Bergen's chain of signal stations and putting an important part of the city's defences out of action.

The Norwegians on board were eventually designated as prisoners and mostly held below decks on the Tartar, with only one or two of them kept on deck to guide the frigate into Bergen. The Tartar anchored off Bjorøyhamn on the evening of 15 May, where she was observed by inhabitants of Alvøen, and sent out four light boats to reconnoitre further in towards Bergen, find out which vessels were lying in its harbour and (last but not least) "bring out the shipping" (i.e. tempt or tow the shipping to sail out from the port and thus pass the Tartar).

Course

Senior lieutenant J. C. A. Bjelke, commander of the Bergen gunboat flotilla  took his five boats  (one kanonchallup and four smaller kanonjoller) out on 16 May to investigate and counter the enemy frigate reported to be lying becalmed and fog-bound near Bjørø (some 13 kilometers west and south from central Bergen)
Opposite (the fort of) Kvarven there was a small boat under oars retreating quickly, at which the Norwegians fired a couple of shots.  As they steered for Bjørø the enemy frigate came under sail and being towed. A lively engagement of 57 minutes ensued.
One of the towing vessels was hit by Bjelke’s second shot, and observers on land reported seeing five holes in the hull.
A breath of southerly wind forced the gunboats to retire as they continued to engage the frigate leaving Gjelte fjord.  Damage to the gunboats involved mostly shot-away oars.

Aftermath

It appeared to some observers that HMS Tartar was about to strike her colours, but at that moment a favourable breeze blew up, allowing the frigate to make good her escape.  The Norwegian commander, Biele, claimed "If the windless wind had not come for us, I dare almost say that the frigate was now ours."

Morale amongst the Norwegians rose quickly at the perceived victory in driving away the large British warship, even though she had not been captured.  Money for building new gunboats became readily available from public subscription.  HMS Tartar was the last major warship to try invading the inner waters of Bergen where large ships could become targets for the highly manoeuvrable smaller gunboats.

The fight had lasted only 57 minutes, each gunboat firing its weapon once every three minutes. Bielke considered this impressive, considering that the flotilla  had been in training for only three weeks.  The money raised from private individuals was sufficient to build three new small gunboats (kanonjoller). With this, it was enough to maintain a force in Bergen and at the same time let some vessels go in convoy service along the coast to protect the trade.

As for HMS Tartar, the ship sailed back to England and was repaired there. The ship participated in several actions along the Norwegian coast after this, then with new ship commander, Joseph Baker. "Tartar" ran aground and sank in Baltic Sea August 18, 1811.

The battle of the Alvøen was not blow in the slightest to RN operations in the Baltic, but was of great importance for the British operations along the Norwegian coast during the war from 1808-1814, emphasising the tactical necessity of avoiding actions close inshore.

Notes

References

Bibliography
Fra Krigens Tid (1807 -1814) (From the wartime) edited by N A Larsen, Christiana (Oslo) 1878. (Title page and Chapter headings)
MILITÆRT TIDSSKRIFT 1967 (Editor: Major K. V. NIELSEN) published by DEN KRIGSVIDENSKABELIGE SELSKAB, containing J. R. Hegland: Marineholmens historie. En skildring av Sjøforsvaret i Bergens Distrikt 1807-1962. (Forsvarets krigshistoriske avdeling, Oslo 1966) pages 146 - 148 (in Norwegian)

Battles of the Gunboat War
Conflicts in 1808
May 1808 events
19th century in Bergen